The 2009 Big Ten Conference football season was the 114th for the conference, and saw Ohio State conclude the regular season as Big Ten Conference champion for the 5th consecutive time, their 34th Big Ten title. This earned them the conference's automatic selection to a Bowl Championship Series game in which it emerged victorious in the January 1, 2010 Rose Bowl against Oregon Ducks. Co-runner-up, Iowa, earned the conference's at-large BCS invitation to the January 5, 2010 Orange Bowl. The season started on Thursday, September 3, as conference member Indiana hosted Eastern Kentucky. The conference’s other 10 teams began their respective 2009 season of NCAA Division I FBS (Football Bowl Subdivision) competition two days later.  All teams started their season at home except Illinois who started their season on neutral turf for the third consecutive season against Missouri and Minnesota who traveled to Syracuse.

Although several players had post season All-star games remaining, the season concluded for Big Ten teams with the 2010 Orange Bowl in which Iowa defeated Georgia Tech.  This was the seventh bowl game for the conference which compiled a 4–3 record.  Over the  course of 77 home games, the conference set a new attendance record.  During the season, Minnesota opened a new athletic stadium, TCF Bank Stadium, and Purdue welcomed a new head coach, Danny Hope.

The season saw John Clay selected as offensive player of the year by both the coaches and the media.  Jared Odrick and Greg Jones won defensive player of the year awards from the coaches and media, respectively.  Chicago Tribune Silver Football recipients as the Big Ten co-MVPs were Daryll Clark and Brandon Graham.  Jones was the conferences only consensus 2009 College Football All-America Team representative. The Big Ten Conference enjoyed two national statistical championships. Graham led the nation in tackles for a loss (TFL). Ray Fisher earned the national statistical championship in kickoff return average and established a new Big Ten single-season record with his performance.  The Big Ten led the nation with six first team Academic All-Americans.  After the season, 34 athletes were selected in the 2010 NFL Draft including three in the first round and six each by Iowa and Penn State.

Previous season
During the 2008 NCAA Division I FBS football season, Ohio State won its fourth consecutive Big Ten championship while co-champion Penn State won its second in four years.  Although the two teams tied with 7–1 conference records, Penn State earned the conference's automatic Bowl Championship Series selection due to a head-to-head victory. The two teams have been the only teams from the conference to win a Big Ten championship in the past four seasons.

During the season, every home game was televised nationally and 98 percent of the Big Ten's games were nationally aired far exceeding all other conferences, none of whom had even 75 percent of their games televised.

Preseason
In a given year, each Big Ten team will play eight of the other Big Ten teams. Thus for any given team in a given year, there are two others which will not be competed against. Below is the breakdown of each team and its two "no-plays" for 2009:

Illinois: Iowa, Wisconsin
Indiana: Michigan State, Minnesota
Iowa: Illinois, Purdue
Michigan: Minnesota, Northwestern
Michigan State: Indiana, Ohio State
Minnesota: Indiana, Michigan
Northwestern: Michigan, Ohio State
Ohio State: Michigan State, Northwestern
Penn State: Purdue, Wisconsin
Purdue: Iowa, Penn State
Wisconsin: Illinois, Penn State

The Big Ten Conference announced on July 27 that the big ten media had elected Ohio State as the preseason favorite for the 2009 football season.  It had ranked Penn State second and Michigan State third.  It chose Ohio State quarterback Terrelle Pryor the Preseason Offensive Player of the Year and Michigan State linebacker Greg Jones the Preseason Defensive Player of the Year.

In the Preseason Coaches' Poll released on August 7, the Big Ten was one of only three conferences with multiple teams ranked in the top ten.

The College Football Hall of Fame has selected Iowa's Larry Station (1982–85), Ohio State's Chris Spielman (1984–87) and Penn State's Curt Warner (1979–82) for December induction.  28 Big Ten athletes were selected in the 2009 National Football League Draft in late April, including four first-round picks.  Two additional players were selected in the 2009 Major League Baseball Draft.

Watchlists
According to the Big Ten Conference at the beginning of the season:
"The Big Ten now features 51 student-athletes on preseason watch lists for 19 different national awards. Among the honored conference players, 27 appear on more than one list and five Big Ten standouts lead the way by appearing on five different lists. Every Big Ten team has at least one player appearing on a watch list. Iowa, Ohio State and Penn State top all Big Ten schools with seven different players appearing on watch lists, followed by six nominees from Illinois and Michigan and five selections for Michigan State and Wisconsin.

On the offensive side of the ball, returning first-team All-Big Ten quarterback Daryll Clark of Penn State appears on the watch lists for the Walter Camp Player of the Year, Manning, Maxwell, Davey O'Brien and Johnny Unitas Golden Arm Awards. Illinois signal caller Juice Williams, a second-team All-Big Ten choice last year, appears on four different lists for the Manning, Maxwell, Davey O'Brien and Johnny Unitas Golden Arm Awards. Illini wideout Arrelious Benn (Biletnikoff, Walter Camp Player of the Year, Maxwell) and Ohio State quarterback Terrelle Pryor (Manning, Maxwell, Davey O'Brien) appear on three different watch lists. Players appearing on two lists include Iowa offensive tackle Bryan Bulaga, Michigan running back Brandon Minor and offensive lineman David Molk, Michigan State center Joel Nitchman, Minnesota wideout Eric Decker and quarterback Adam Weber, Northwestern center Ben Burkett, Ohio State center Mike Brewster, Penn State running back Evan Royster and offensive lineman Stefan Wisniewski and the Wisconsin trio of running back John Clay, tight end Garrett Graham and center John Moffitt.

On the defensive side of the ball, four standouts appear on five different watch lists. Big Ten Preseason Defensive Player of the Year and returning first-team All-Big Ten linebacker Greg Jones of Michigan State has been named to the watch lists for the Bednarik, Butkus and Rotary Lombardi Awards and the Lott and Nagurski Trophies. Fellow linebacker Sean Lee of Penn State, who missed last season due to injury after earning second-team All-Big Ten accolades in 2007, appears on the same five watch lists as Jones. Defensive ends Brandon Graham of Michigan and Corey Wootton of Northwestern were both tabbed for the Bednarik, Ted Hendricks, Rotary Lombardi, Lott  and Nagurski watch lists. Wootton was a first-team All-Big Ten choice last year while Graham was named to the second team. Two more Nittany Lion standouts were named to four watch lists in linebacker NaVorro Bowman (Bednarik, Butkus, Lombardi, Nagurski) and defensive tackle Jared Odrick (Bednarik, Lombardi, Nagurski, Outland). Other defensive standouts to appear on multiple lists include Illinois linebacker Martez Wilson, Indiana defensive end Jammie Kirlew, Iowa linebacker Pat Angerer and Ohio State safety Kurt Coleman."

Award watch lists

Lott Trophy, Bronko Nagurski Trophy, and Jim Thorpe Award watchlist candidate Kurt Coleman of Ohio State, was suspended by the Big Ten Conference for one game.  The suspension was for a violation of the new 2009 NCAA football playing rule that required mandatory conference video review of an act where a player initiates helmet-to-helmet contact and targets a defenseless opponent.  The incident occurred during the September 26 game against Illinois.

Midseason
Obi Ezeh, Jones and Lee were among the sixteen selected to the midseason Butkus watchlist and Clark was named as one of ten finalists for the Unitas award. Eight Big Ten athletes were named as semifinalists for the Campbell Trophy: Illinois' Jon Asamoah, Indiana's Jammie Kirlew, Michigan's Zoltan Mesko, Minnesota's Eric Decker, Northwestern's Andrew Brewer, Ohio State's Jim Cordle, Penn State's Josh Hull and Wisconsin's Mickey Turner on October 1. Four Big Ten Players midseason watch list for the John Mackey Award: Moeaki, Gantt, Quarless and Graham.  Three were quarterfinalists for the Lott Award: Angerer, Jones and Coleman. The Big Ten had two O'Brien Award semifinalists: Stanzi and Clark. Eric Decker was named one of 10 semifinalists for the Biletnikoff Award.  Jones has been selected as a semifinalists for the Bednarik Award along with Angerer, Bowman and Wisconsin defensive end O'Brien Schofield. Hawkeyes' Tyler Sash was chosen as a semifinalist for the Jim Thorpe Award. Swenson and Northwestern's Stefan Demos were named semifinalists for the Groza Award. Mesko, Blair White, and Andrew Brewer were among the 12 finalists for the Wuerffel Trophy. Mesko, and Donahue were among 10 semifinalists for the Guy Award. Mesko was named one of three finalists for the Ray Guy Award. Michigan's Graham was a finalist for the Henricks Award.

Rankings

Unlike most sports, college football's governing body, the NCAA, does not bestow a National Championship title. That title is bestowed by one or more of four different polling agencies. There are two main weekly polls that begin in the preseason: the AP Poll and the Coaches Poll. Two additional polls are released midway through the season; the Harris Interactive Poll is released after the fourth week of the season and the Bowl Championship Series (BCS) Standings is released after the seventh week. The Harris Poll and Coaches Poll are factors in the BCS Standings.

Spring games
April 11
Michigan

April 18
Indiana
Purdue
Wisconsin

April 25
Illinois
Michigan State
Minnesota
Northwestern
Ohio State
Penn State

Did not have spring game this year
Iowa

Season
Purdue head coach Danny Hope began his  first season in West Lafayette. On September 12, Minnesota opened the 2009 season its new 50,720-seat home field, TCF Bank Stadium when the team hosted the Air Force Falcons.  For the third straight year, each Big Ten home game during the first three weeks of the season was broadcast nationally on ABC, ESPN, ESPN2 or the Big Ten Network, which televised more than 20 contests altogether in the opening weeks, including all nine home games in Week 1. Every ABC afternoon telecast was broadcast nationally, either on ABC or simultaneously on ESPN or ESPN2.  Note that although the Big Ten is a regional conference the Big Ten Network, which was available in 19 of the 20 largest U.S. media markets, was available to approximately 73 million homes in the U.S. and Canada through agreements with more than 250 cable television or satellite television affiliates.

The season began amidst allegations that Michigan was working its players beyond the extent permissible by the NCAA.  Nonetheless, the conference had its fifth ten-win week during the opening weekend.  During week 3, the Ohio State-USC game became the most-viewed college football game in ESPN history.  After three weeks, the Big Ten Conference was the only Football Bowl Subdivision conference with five 3–0 teams.

Homecoming games 
September 26
Michigan 36, Indiana 33 (Michigan's record in homecoming games is 83-26)† 

October 3
Northwestern 27, Purdue 21 (Purdue's record in homecoming games is 48-35-4)† 

October 10
Michigan State 24, Illinois 14 (Illinois's record in homecoming games is 42-55-2)† 
Iowa 30, Michigan 28 (Iowa's record in homecoming games is 52-41-5)† 
Minnesota 35, Purdue 20 (Minnesota's record in homecoming games is 54-33-3)† 

October 17
Indiana 27, Illinois 14 (Indiana's record in homecoming games is 43-48-6)† 
Michigan State 24, Northwestern 14 (Michigan State's record in homecoming games is 61-30-3)† 
Penn State 20, Minnesota 0 (Penn State's record in homecoming games is 65-20-5)† 
Iowa 20, Wisconsin 10 (Wisconsin's record in homecoming games is 52-45-5)†  

October 24
Northwestern 29, Indiana 28 11:00 a.m. CT 
Ohio State 38, Minnesota 7 (Ohio State's record in homecoming games is 64-19-5)† 

† denotes record after the game

Schedule

Week one

Week two

Week three

Week four

Week five

Week six

Week seven

Week eight

Week nine

Week ten

Week eleven

Week twelve

Week thirteen

Week fourteen

Records against other conferences
The following summarizes the Big Ten's record this season vs. other conferences.

Big Ten vs. BCS matchups
During the season, Big Ten teams played several games against BCS conference opponents.  Some of these games are regularly contested rivalry games.

Bowl games
On December 6, the Bowl matchups were announced. It marked the fifth consecutive season that at least seven Big Ten teams earned bowl game invitations and the ninth time in twelve-year history of the Bowl Championship Series that the conference was awarded two BCS invitations.

(*) denotes BCS game
Big Ten team and score in bold
Winning team and score listed first in italics

Players of the week
Throughout the conference regular season, the Big Ten offices named offensive, defensive and special teams players of the week each Sunday.

Big Ten Conference football individual honors

At the conclusion of week 12, the coaches and media made Big Ten Conference football individual honors selections.  John Clay was selected as offensive player of the year by both the coaches and the media.  Jared Odrick and Greg Jones won defensive player of the year awards from the coaches and media, respectively.  Bryan Bulaga and Odrick were selected as offensive and defensive linemen of the year.  Chris Borland was freshman of the year and Kirk Ferentz was Coach of the Year.  The Chicago Tribune Silver Football recipients as the Big Ten co-MVPs were Daryll Clark and Brandon Graham, marking the first time the award has been shared.

All-Conference
The following players were selected as All-Big Ten at the conclusion of the season.

 Additional honorees due to ties

Position key

All-Americans

The following players were chosen as All-Americans for the Associated Press, American Football Coaches Association, ESPN, Football Writers Association of America, CBS Sports, Sports Illustrated, Rivals.com, Scout.com, College Football News, Walter Camp Football Foundation or the Pro Football Weekly teams.

All-Star Games
The following players were selected to play in post season All-Star Games:
January 23, 2010 East-West Shrine Game
Jim Cordle
Doug Worthington
Daryll Clark
Jeremy Boone
Andrew Quarless
Mike Neal
Kyle Calloway
O'Brien Schofield
Blair White
Rodger Saffold

Kafka earned offensive MVP; Shofield was named defensive MVP, and White led all receivers with seven catches for 93 yards.

January 30 2010 Senior Bowl
Kurt Coleman
A. J. Edds
Brandon Graham
Garrett Graham
Mike Hoomanawanui
Zoltan Mesko
Mike Neal
Jared Odrick
Brett Swenson

Brandon Graham earned MVP honors with five tackles, two sacks, one forced fumble.

February 6, 2010 Texas vs. The Nation Game
Dennis Landolt
A.J. Wallace
Simoni Lawrence
Nick Polk
Josh Hull
Nathan Triplett
Aaron Pettrey

All Big Ten Players represented the nation.

Statistics
The Big Ten had two national statistical leaders: Brandon Graham led the nation with 2.17 tackles for a loss per game ahead of national second-place finisher O'Brien Schofield and Ray Fisher led the nation in kickoff return average with 37.35.  Greg Jones ranked third nationally in tackles per game at 11.85 followed closely by Pat Angerer who finished fourth.  Ryan Kerrigan finished third in quarterback sacks per game with 1.08.

The Big Ten saw several career and single-season Big Ten records fall. Mike Kafka broke Drew Brees 1998 record for single-season offensive plays (642 vs. 638). Fisher's return average was a Big Ten single-season record, surpassing the 1965 record.  Troy Stoudermire accumulated 43 kickoff returns, which tied Earl Douthitt's 1973 single-season total.  David Gilreath's 108 career kickoff returns surpassed the 106 set by Brandon Williams (2002–05) and Derrick Mason (1993–96).  Other near single-season records were Tyler Sash's 203 interception return yards, which fell short of the 207 set in 2003 by Alan Zemaitis and Ryan Kerrigan's 7 forced fumbles, which was short of the 8 set by Jonal Saint-Dic in 2007. Jim Tressel became the second head coach to secure five consecutive Big Ten championships.

Attendance
In 2009, the Big Ten established a new overall conference attendance record with 5,526,237 fans attending 77 home games. This surpassed the previous record set in 2002 when a total of 5,499,439 was reached in 78 contests. Below is a table of home game attendances.

Academic honors
26 Big Ten student-athletes were named to the Academic All-District teams presented by ESPN The Magazine, including 18 first-team selections: Illinois' Jon Asamoah, Indiana's Brandon Bugg, Trea Burgess and Ben Chappell, Michigan's Zoltan Mesko, Michigan State's Blair White, Minnesota's Eric Decker and Jeff Tow-Arnett, Northwestern's Doug Bartels, Stefan Demos and Zeke Markshausen, Penn State's Jeremy Boone, Josh Hull, Andrew Pitz and Stefen Wisniewski, Purdue's Joe Holland and Ryan Kerrigan and Wisconsin's Brad Nortman. The Nittany Lions were one of only six schools nationwide with four or more first-team selections. Second-team picks included the Hawkeyes' Julian Vandervelde, the Wolverines' Jon Conover, the Spartans' Adam Decker and Andrew Hawken and the Buckeyes' Bryant Browning, Todd Denlinger, Andrew Moses and Marcus Williams. To be eligible for the award, a player must be in at least his second year of athletic eligibility, be a first-team or key performer and carry a cumulative 3.30 grade point average. First-team selections will be added to the national ballot and are eligible for Academic All-America honors to be announced on November 24. Penn State's Hull and Pitz are looking to earn Academic All-America accolades for the second straight year.

For the fifth consecutive season the Big Ten had more (8) student-athletes named to the ESPN The Magazine Academic All-America first or second teams in football than any other conference whether they be a member of the Football Bowl Subdivision (FBS) or the Football Championship Subdivision (FCS). The Big Ten also had six of the fifteen first-team selections, which led the nation. FCS' Missouri Valley Conference was second with five first or second team selections and the FBS' Big 12 Conference had four honorees. Only the Big 12 and Southeastern Conference had two first team selections. The Academic All-America first-team honorees from the Big Ten include Zoltan Mesko, Blair White, Zeke Markshausen, Josh Hull, Andrew Pitz and Stefen Wisniewski. Second-team honors went to Northwestern's Stefan Demos and Purdue's Ryan Kerrigan. Hull and Pitz were repeat first-team selections.  The Big Ten conference also recognized 193 football players as fall term 2009-10 Academic All-Conference honorees, including Purdue's Joe Holland who has maintained a 4.0 Grade Point Average.  The student-athletes honorees were letterwinners in at least their second academic year at their institution and who carry a cumulative grade point average of 3.0 or higher.

2010 NFL Draft

The 2010 saw 34 Big Ten athletes selected.  This included at least one representative from each member school, making the Big Ten one of only two conferences to have each of its members represented among the draft selections.  Iowa and Penn State each had six selections.  The Big Ten had three first round selections: Big Ten Silver Football co-winner Brandon Graham was selected 13th overall by Philadelphia. Big Ten Offensive Lineman of the Year Bryan Bulaga 23rd by Green Bay, while Big Ten Defensive Player and Lineman of the Year Jared Odrick was chosen 28th overall by Miami.

See also
 2009–10 Big Ten Conference men's basketball season

References